Skin is the debut studio album by British singer-songwriter Joy Crookes, released through Insanity Records on 15 October 2021. The album has spawned four singles, including "Feet Don't Fail Me Now" and "When You Were Mine", both of which reached number one on the UK Asian Top 40 chart. The album was nominated for the 2022 Mercury Prize.

Primarily a modern soul-jazz record led by orchestral string arrangements, Skin is an "autobiographical body of work" inspired by Crookes' heritage and identity, as well as her experiences of young adulthood and heartbreak. The album was met with widespread acclaim upon release, with critics praising the subject matter, production and Crookes' vocal performance.

Background and release 
At the 2020 Brit Awards, Joy Crookes was nominated for the Rising Star Award, which predicts the biggest upcoming British musicians. In September of that year, she gained moderate mainstream attention with the release of her cover version of The Wannadies' 1994 single "You & Me Song", which was featured in an O2 TV advertisement, consequently entering both the UK Singles Downloads and the UK Singles Sales charts. In June 2021, Crookes released the single "Feet Don't Fail Me Now" and its accompanying music video. The track debuted atop the UK Asian Music Top 40 chart, while the music video was nominated for Best Pop Video - UK, Best Wardrobe Styling in a Video and Best Hair & Makeup in a Video at the 2021 UK Music Video Awards.

In August 2021, Crookes announced the release of Skin, and released its title track alongside a music video as the second single. "When You Were Mine" was released later that month as the third single and reached number one on the UK Asian Top 40. Its accompanying music video was released in early October 2021. "Trouble" was released as the fourth single on 13 October 2021, two days before the release of the album.

Composition and lyrics 
Described by Clash as "orchestral soul-jazz", Skin is primarily a modern soul record with elements of R&B, jazz, pop, neo-soul and trip-hop, and is characterized by its orchestral string arrangements. There are also a number of piano ballads on the album. Inspired largely by her own British-Irish-Bangladeshi heritage, Crookes lyrically explores themes of young adulthood, heartbreak, and identity. In a post on social media, Crookes wrote "This is the proudest work I have made to date. It is an autobiographical body of work, the album consists of songs I wrote when I was 15 up until 22. This is an album about my identity."

Critical reception 

Skin received widespread acclaim in reviews from contemporary music critics upon release. At Metacritic, which assigns a normalised rating out of 100 to reviews from professional publications, the album has an average score of 89, based on 4 reviews.

DIY rated the album five out of five stars and described it as "a rich, varied and considered body of work [...] worthy of elevating the singer into the realm of Britain's classiest chart-bothering talents", noting that it "does everything a debut should, dipping into multiple pools but uniting them all with a consistent outlook and a clear voice." Apart from praising its sociopolitical subject matter, Alim Kheraj of The Guardian described the record as "vibrant, urgent and brimming with life", and wrote that "if the point of a debut album is getting to know an artist, then Skin is a masterclass." Writing for NME, Sophie Williams noted that it "rises from the most intimate pockets of Crookes's life: the emotional turmoil around growing up, heartbreak, forgiveness, and relationships that don't offer the sanctuary they promise." In a review for Clash, Hannah Browne described Skin as "a candid, soulful exploration of identity" with "13 smooth jams [that] showcase Joy Crookes not only as a vocalist or candid writer but as the new face of British soul."

Track listing

Charts

References 

2021 debut albums
Sony Music UK albums
Soul albums by English artists